Feldbach railway station is a railway station in Switzerland, situated near the village of Feldbach in the municipality of Hombrechtikon. The station is located on the Lake Zurich right bank railway line

The station is served by the following passenger trains:

References

External links 
 
 

Railway stations in the canton of Zürich
Swiss Federal Railways stations
Hombrechtikon